The year 1904 in science and technology involved some significant events, listed below.

Astronomy
 Johannes Franz Hartmann discovers the interstellar medium.
 Edward Walter Maunder plots the first sunspot "butterfly diagram".
 Notable asteroid 522 Helga is discovered by Max Wolf in Heidelberg.
 December 3 – The sixth moon of Jupiter, later called Himalia, is discovered at Lick Observatory.

Cartography
 Van der Grinten projection proposed.

Mathematics
 Henri Poincaré discovers the Poincaré homology sphere, leading him to formulate the Poincaré conjecture.
 Helge von Koch describes the "Koch snowflake", one of the earliest fractal curves described.
 Charles Spearman develops his rank correlation coefficient.
 Ernst Zermelo formulates the axiom of choice to formalize his proof of the well-ordering theorem.

Medicine
 September 17 – An early study on the relationship between alcohol and cardiovascular disease is published in the United States.
 Epinephrine first artificially synthesized by Friedrich Stolz.
 Antoni Leśniowski presents to a meeting of the Warsaw Medical Society a surgical specimen of an inflammatory tumour of the terminal ileum with a fistula to the ascending colon, consistent with what will later become known as Crohn's disease.

Physics
 Vacuum tube invented by John Ambrose Fleming.
 James H. Jeans's The Dynamical Theory of Gases is published in Cambridge.
 J. J. Thomson proposes the plum pudding model for the atom.
 Hantaro Nagaoka develops the Saturnian model for the atom.

Technology
 July 4 – Piero Ginori Conti demonstrates the use of geothermal power to generate electricity, at Larderello in Italy.
 July 23 – A continuous track tractor is patented by David Roberts of Richard Hornsby & Sons of Grantham in England.
 November 16 – John Ambrose Fleming patents the first thermionic vacuum tube, the two-electrode diode ("oscillation valve" or  Fleming valve).
 November 24 – A continuous track tractor is demonstrated by the Holt Manufacturing Company in the United States.
 The first diesel engined submarine, the Z, is built in France.
 The Heckelphone variety of oboe is invented by Wilhelm Heckel and his sons.
 The sleeve valve is invented by Charles Yale Knight.
 The turbine-powered Bliss-Leavitt torpedo, designed by Frank McDowell Leavitt and manufactured by the E. W. Bliss Company of Brooklyn, is put into service by the United States Navy.
 Lucien Bull produces the first successful chronophotography (of insect flight), working in France.
 Rue Franklin Apartments, Paris, are completed by Auguste Perret and his brother Gustave, an early example of an exposed reinforced concrete frame building.

Zoology
 First identification and last confirmed sighting of the Choiseul pigeon in the Solomon Islands.

Awards
 Nobel Prizes
 Physics – John William Strutt, 3rd Baron Rayleigh
 Chemistry – Sir William Ramsay
 Medicine –  Ivan Pavlov

Births
 January 21 – Edris Rice-Wray Carson (died 1990), American-born physician, pioneer in family planning.
 January 26 – Ancel Keys (died 2004), American nutritionist.
 March 13 – René Dumont (died 2001), French agronomist.
 March 20 – B. F. Skinner (died 1990), American behavioral psychologist.
 April 11 – Arthur Mourant (died 1994), Jersiais hematologist.
 April 22 – J. Robert Oppenheimer (died 1967), American physicist.
 June 3 – Charles R. Drew (died 1950), African American physician, pioneer in blood transfusion.
 July 5 – Ernst Mayr (died 2005), German-born evolutionary biologist.
 August 5 – Kenneth V. Thimann (died 1997), English-American plant physiologist and microbiologist known for his studies of plant hormones.
 August 17 – Cornelis Simon Meijer (died 1974), Dutch mathematician.
 August 28 – Secondo Campini (died 1980), Italian jet pioneer.
 August 29 – Werner Forssmann (died 1979), German physician, recipient of the Nobel Prize in Physiology or Medicine.
 November 11 – J. H. C. Whitehead (died 1960), British mathematician.
 Sven Sømme (died 1961), Norwegian ichthyologist and resistance worker.

Deaths
 March 7 – Ferdinand André Fouqué (born 1828), French geologist, petrologist and volcanologist.
 May 10 – Henry Morton Stanley (born 1841), Welsh-born explorer and journalist.
 July 3 – John Bell Hatcher (born 1861), American paleontologist.
 September 24 – Niels Ryberg Finsen (born 1860), Icelandic/Faroese/Danish physician and scientist, recipient of the Nobel Prize in Physiology or Medicine.
 October 7 – Isabella Bird (born 1831), British explorer, writer, photographer and naturalist.
 October 21 – Isabelle Eberhardt (born 1877), Swiss-Algerian explorer.

References

 
20th century in science
1900s in science